Kovski Vrh is a small settlement above Visoko in the Municipality of Škofja Loka in the Upper Carniola region of Slovenia.

Name
Kovski Vrh is one of several neighboring villages whose names end with vrh 'peak' (cf. Bukov Vrh, Črni Vrh, Srednji Vrh, and Valterski Vrh). The modifier kovski derives from the common noun kolk, dialect kovk 'hill'; the name therefore means 'hill peak'.

References

External links
Kovski Vrh at Geopedia

Populated places in the Municipality of Škofja Loka